Sunshine railway station is located on the Sunbury line in Victoria, Australia. Originally named Braybrook Junction for the convergence of the major railways from central Melbourne to Ballarat and Bendigo, it was renamed when the suburb of Sunshine, which it serves, took its name from the nearby Sunshine Harvester Works. With the expansion of the railway network in Melbourne's west, Sunshine grew in importance, with cross-suburban goods routes constructed to Newport and from the adjacent Albion to Jacana line. From the mid-20th century, it became an interchange for the main interstate routes to South Australia and New South Wales, when the through line from Melbourne to Sydney was completed, although the main line to Adelaide was later diverted. In the early 21st century, the station was demolished and reconstructed to serve the diversion of the main passenger route to Geelong and beyond. It has been identified as a possible route for a future line to Melbourne Airport and as an interchange for the orbital Suburban Rail Loop.

Today, Sunshine is served by Metro Trains' services on the Sunbury line, and V/Line services on the Geelong and Ballarat lines. Bendigo and freight services to northern Victoria and towards Sydney also pass through the station. A large bus interchange at the station is a hub for surrounding suburbs.

History

Sunshine station opened on 7 September 1885 as Braybrook Junction. It was renamed Sunshine on 15 July 1907.

19th century
The Melbourne & Murray River Railway (now named the Bendigo line), originating from Spencer Street station, was built in the late 1850s, from Footscray to Sunbury and Bendigo, however, no station was built at that time on the current site; the closest station was Albion and Darlington, on the site of the current Albion station.

In 1885, the Serviceton line from Melbourne to Ballarat, via Bacchus Marsh, was provided, branching off from the Bendigo line, and a station at the junction of the two lines was built. The station opened on 7 September 1885 as Braybrook Junction, named such as it was at the junction of the two lines, and was within the Shire of Braybrook.

In 1887, the Sunshine – Newport line, connecting the new station at Braybrook Junction to Newport and Williamstown, Victoria's major cargo port at the time, was opened.

20th century
In 1907, Braybrook Junction station was renamed Sunshine, when Hugh McKay moved his Sunshine Harvester Works adjacent to the station. 

On 20 April 1908, Sunshine was the scene of the worst train crash in Victorian railway history, the Sunshine train disaster. 44 persons were killed and over 400 passengers were injured.

The Albion – Jacana line opened in 1929, connecting Sunshine with the North East line, allowing freight trains to avoid the steeper grades and suburban traffic on the suburban line between North Melbourne, Essendon and Broadmeadows.

The road level crossing at Sunshine was removed when grade separation was carried out in 1961. The works took place as part of the project to construct a standard gauge line from Sydney to Melbourne. In that same year, boom barriers were provided at the nearby former Anderson Road level crossing, on the Bendigo line.

In January 1963, a fourth platform was provided on the adjacent Melbourne – Sydney standard gauge line, to enable passengers to transfer between the interstate Sydney and Adelaide expresses. In 1965, control of signals at Albion was transferred to the signal box at Sunshine. Also in that year, the Grain Elevator Board sidings, that serve the nearby grail silos, opened for traffic. In 1976, a signal panel was provided to replace an existing panel, and in 1977, boom barriers were provided at the nearby former Anderson Road level crossing, on the Serviceton line.

Demolished station White City was located between Sunshine and Tottenham. It closed on 4 October 1981.

On 5 February 1985, Harris trailer carriage 830T was destroyed by fire in a vandalism attack, whist stabled in the former Down end siding.

In 1988, the sidings leading to Massey Ferguson were booked out of use. The lead to the sidings, which crossed the standard gauge line, was removed in February of that year.

In 1994, the former station underpass, which connected the platforms to nearby City Place, was completed, and replaced an earlier underpass. It was removed during the station upgrades between 2012 and 2014. Also in that year, the track leading to the former goods shed was removed, and a number of semaphore signals were replaced with automatic colour signals.

On 26 July 1996, Sunshine was upgraded to a Premium Station.

21st century
In mid 2004, the platform on the standard gauge line was removed. The waiting room on the platform was demolished five years earlier, in 1999.

From 2012 to 2014, the station was rebuilt as part of the Regional Rail Link project. Works included:
 a new bus interchange, completed in September 2013;
 construction of a new footbridge and concourse, completed in January 2014;
 upgrading Platforms 1 and 2 with new canopies;
 rebuilding Platform 3 and a new Platform 4, both completed in April 2014;

On 28 April 2014, the completed station was opened to the public.

The standalone signal box to the north of the station, commissioned in 1914, was closed in 2016, and its control of the Sunshine and Albion areas transferred to Metrol. The former signal box is one of the largest surviving examples of a tappet and lever frame box on the Victorian network, having once housed 80 levers. Although mechanical signalling was replaced with electronic interlocking before the box was finally taken out of service, it remains relatively intact as an example of Victorian Railways signal box architecture.

In early 2020, construction commenced on a new signal control centre south of the station, which will share control of the Sunshine–Dandenong corridor with an existing facility at Dandenong, after completion of the Metro Tunnel.

Expansion and precinct masterplan

On 22 July 2018, the Victorian State Government announced that the Melbourne Airport rail link will be funded with state and Commonwealth money, and that it will operate from the Melbourne CBD to Melbourne Airport via Sunshine. Sunshine would become an important interchange station under this plan, providing a connection between western regional and metropolitan rail lines and the new service to Melbourne Airport. As part of this project, the state government committed to building a "super hub" at Sunshine for passengers transferring between V/Line services, metropolitan services and airport trains.

Immediate works at Sunshine, funded as part of the airport link, include the construction of a second accessible concourse for interchanging, extra ticket gates, new lifts, a new regional platform and extensions of existing regional platforms. A large 18m high flyover is also being built north of Sunshine, above the Albion rail junction.

In 2022, construction commenced on the Airport link. In October of that year, the State Government released a masterplan for the Sunshine station precinct, which envisioned a significant expansion of the station and its surrounds to cater for expected growth in patronage. The long-term masterplan envisioned multiple new entrances to the station, a new integrated bus interchange, new open spaces, new high-density developments surrounding the station and the creation of new pedestrian and cycling links across the rail lines.

The state government committed $143 million to the first stage of the masterplan to be delivered alongside the Airport rail link works, which included the new bus interchange, new pedestrian paths, new open-space, establishing future development sites and preparation for future stages.

Facilities, platforms and services

Sunshine has two side platforms and a centre island platform with two faces. Access is provided to the platforms using stairs, lifts and ramps from an overhead footbridge and concourse, which features a customer service window, an enclosed waiting room and toilets.

It is serviced by Metro Trains' Sunbury line and V/Line Ballarat and Geelong line services.

Platform 1:
  all stations and limited express services to Flinders Street

Platform 2:
  all stations services to Watergardens and Sunbury

By late 2025, it is planned that trains on the Sunbury line will be through-routed with those on the Pakenham and Cranbourne lines, via the new Metro Tunnel.

Platform 3:
  V/Line services to Southern Cross (set down only)
  V/Line services to Southern Cross (set down only)

Platform 4:
  V/Line services to Melton, Bacchus Marsh, Wendouree and Ararat (pick up only)
  V/Line services to Wyndham Vale, Geelong and Waurn Ponds (pick up only)

Transport links

There are 14 bus services that use the bus interchange at Sunshine station.

CDC Melbourne operates three routes via Sunshine station, under contract to Public Transport Victoria:
 : to Laverton station (via Robinsons Road, shared with Transit Systems Victoria)
 : St Albans station – Highpoint Shopping Centre
 : to Footscray (via Ballarat Road)

Kinetic Melbourne operates four routes via Sunshine station, under contract to Public Transport Victoria:
 : to Melbourne CBD (Queen Street) (via Dynon Road)
 : to Melbourne CBD (Queen Street) via (Footscray Road)
 : to Sunshine South (loop service)
  : Altona station – Mordialloc

Transit Systems Victoria operates eight routes to and from Sunshine station, under contract to Public Transport Victoria:
 : to Laverton station (via Robinsons Road, shared with CDC Melbourne)
 : to Watergardens station (via Deer Park)
 : to Brimbank Central Shopping Centre
 : to Sunshine West (via Forrest Street)
 : to Sunshine West
 : to Woodgrove Shopping Centre (Melton) (via Rockbank)
 : to Williamstown (via Newport and Altona Gate Shopping Centre)
  : to Watergardens station (Saturday and Sunday mornings only)

Gallery

References

External links
 
 Rail Geelong gallery
 Melway map

Premium Melbourne railway stations
Former rail freight terminals in Victoria (Australia)
Railway stations in Melbourne
Railway stations in Australia opened in 1885
Sunshine, Victoria
Railway stations in the City of Brimbank